RKS Liblice 1 was a facility for commercial long wave radio transmission located in the Czech Republic about  east of Prague near Liblice. The towers were demolished by explosives on August 11, 2004, as they were no longer needed.

The time-signal broadcasts on VLF ceased in 1995 and the medium-wave broadcast of Czech Radio Programme 2 was transferred to the adjacent site with a super-power transmitter, Liblice II.

See also 
 List of towers
 OMA (time signal)

External links 
 Liblice 1
 Prostor - architektura, interiér, design
 Drawings of RKS Liblice 1- Mast 1 - SkyscraperPage.com
 Drawings of RKS Liblice 1- Mast 2 - SkyscraperPage.com

Towers in the Czech Republic
Former radio masts and towers
Kolín District